Vallabhdas Sitaram Mahajan was an Indian politician and Advocate from the state of the Madhya Pradesh.
He represented Maheshwar Vidhan Sabha constituency in Madhya Pradesh Legislative Assembly by winning in the 1957 Indian general election.

References 

Year of birth missing
Possibly living people
Madhya Pradesh MLAs 1957–1962
People from Khargone district
Indian National Congress politicians from Madhya Pradesh